Midnight Club is a 1933 American pre-Code crime drama film about a gang of London jewel thieves infiltrated by an undercover agent (George Raft).  The film was directed by Alexander Hall and George Somnes. Produced and distributed by Paramount Pictures it is based on the 1931 short story Gangster's Glory
by E. Phillips Oppenheim.

Synopsis
A successful gang of jewel thieves are operating out a London nightclub, using doubles to take their places in the nightspot while they are out committing crimes. The police commissioner calls in American detective Nick Mason to infiltrate the gang.

Cast

Clive Brook as Colin Grant
George Raft as Nick Mason
Helen Vinson as Iris Whitney
Alison Skipworth as Lady Barrett-Smythe
Sir Guy Standing as Commissioner Hope
Alan Mowbray as Arthur Bradley
 Ferdinand Gottschalk as George Rubens
 Forrester Harvey as Thomas Roberts
 Ethel Griffies as 	The Duchess
 Teru Shimada as 	Nishi 
 Charles Coleman as Carstairs
 Billy Bevan as 	Detective
 Jean De Briac as 	Headwaiter
 Leo White as 	Waiter 
 Rita Carlyle as	Nick's landlady 
 Dennis O'Keefe as Dance Extra

References

External links 
 
Review of film at Variety

1933 films
1933 crime drama films
American crime drama films
American black-and-white films
American detective films
Paramount Pictures films
Films directed by Alexander Hall
Films set in London
Films based on British novels
1930s English-language films
1930s American films